Roberto Pupo Moreno (born 11 February 1959), usually known as Roberto Moreno and also as Pupo Moreno, is a Brazilian former racing driver. He participated in 75 Formula One Grands Prix, achieved 1 podium, and scored a total of 15 championship points. He raced in CART in 1986, and was Formula 3000 champion (in 1988) before joining Formula One full-time in 1989. He returned to CART in 1996 where he enjoyed an Indian summer in 2000 and 2001, and managed to extend his career in the series until 2008. He also raced in endurance events and GT's in Brazil, but now works as a driver coach and consultant, and although this takes up a lot of his time, he is not officially retired yet, as he appears in historic events. Away from the sport, he enjoys building light aeroplanes.

Moreno was known as the "Super Sub" late in his career as he was used to replace injured drivers several times.

Career

Early career
After winning the 1976 Brazilian 125cc Karting championship, Moreno set his sights on getting to Europe. He arrived in England in 1979, to race in his first season in Formula Ford. He did some races with  Marc Smith racing who was the works Royale driver for that year. Marc had a two car transporter to take his and Roberto's car. Roberto was the driver and the mechanic for his Royale car. Ralt owner/designer Ron Tauranac lent Moreno an old shed to work out of as his home base. He had a couple of good results, and these convinced Ralph Firman Sr, to sign him as a works Van Diemen driver for the 1980 season. Whilst driving for Firman, he would win the Townsend Thoresen British Formula Ford title, winning eight races in the process. Meanwhile, in Europe, he drove the same car to three more victories, earning himself second place in the EFDA Townsend Thoresen Euroseries Formula Ford 1600 Championship. His also finished 4th in the RAC British series and 6th the P&O Ferries series. He then rounded out the season by winning the Formula Ford Festival. Moreno would return to race at the Formula Ford Festival in the same car at the 50th anniversary of the  Festival in 2021.

Moreno's success alerted the attention of no lesser person than Colin Chapman, the successful owner and founder of Formula One's Team Lotus. Roberto only returned to Europe in 1981, because Chapman had given him a F1 testing contract with enough money to continue racing. With these funds, he raced Formula Three, but money was tight. Despite that, paired with Barron Racing, he managed to win two races, however he was more successful across the Atlantic the following season, racing in the CASC North American Formula Atlantic Championship, defeating Al Unser Jr. in a supporting race at the 1982 United States Grand Prix West in Long Beach. Later in 1982, he made another big impression by winning the Grand Prix de Trois-Rivières. Prior to that victory, Moreno had found some money to do half a season in the British Formula 3 Championship with Ivens Lumar Racing, winning three races in the process, before he was given the opportunity to drive at the 1982 Dutch Grand Prix at Zandvoort for Lotus, though he ultimately failed to qualify.

Australian Grand Prix (1981–1984)

In this period, Moreno (who like his friend Nelson Piquet was managed by Australian Greg "Pee Wee" Siddle) was a popular triple winner of the Australian Grand Prix in 1981, 1983 and 1984, before it became a Formula One World Championship race from 1985. These wins came in the days when the Grand Prix was a Formula Mondial race held at Melbourne's 1.6 km (1.0 mi) Calder Park Raceway. He often defeated current or past World Drivers' Champions to win the AGP, including Piquet, Alan Jones, Niki Lauda and Keke Rosberg, as well as other F1 drivers such as Jacques Laffite, Andrea de Cesaris and François Hesnault. In the only Australian Grand Prix he competed in but did not win during the period (1982), he finished third behind future four time World Champion Alain Prost, and Ligier F1 driver Laffite. In all of his pre-F1 Australian Grand Prix drives, Moreno drove a Formula Pacific or Formula Mondial Ralt RT4 powered by a 1.6 litre Ford 4cyl engine.

F1 Substitute (1982 & 1987)

Moreno was winning races in Formula Atlantic, Formula Mondial and Formula Three, when he received a call-up from Colin Chapman to stand in for Nigel Mansell at Lotus at the 1982 Dutch Grand Prix after Mansell broke his wrist in the previous Grand Prix in Canada. Prior to this, Theodore Racing's Jan Lammers broke a thumb during the Detroit Grand Prix and team owner Teddy Yip wanted Moreno to take over the seat, however Chapman refused to release him. Then during the race in Montréal, Mansell injured his wrist, allowing for Moreno to stand in. This soon turned into a nightmare, as the Lotus 91 was a beast to handle, Moreno had barely driven the car, as regular drivers, Mansell and Elio de Angelis did most of the testing, with Moreno being restricted to the older Lotus 87B and Lotus 88 models. Moreno failed to come to grips with the Lotus 91, with his best qualifying lap over two seconds away from making the grid. At the end of 1982, Lotus released him from his duties as test driver and it took his reputation a while to recover from this poor showing.

He was to get another chance, but that Dutch race handicapped him for a number of years. At the end of the  season he was called up to replace Pascal Fabre for the AGS team at the Japanese Grand Prix. Five years after the Lotus fiasco, Moreno was set to make his debut, except he was the slowest of all and once again did not qualify. However, Williams driver Nigel Mansell injured himself during practice and the team subsequently withdrew his entry, thus letting Moreno in for his debut Grand Prix. In the following race, the Australian Grand Prix, he drove the ungainly JH22 between the walls of the Adelaide Street Circuit to finish a fine 7th, while others hit the walls and broke their cars. Following post-race scrutineering, Ayrton Senna's Lotus-Honda was disqualified from 2nd for oversized brake ducts and Moreno was promoted to 6th place, scoring his, and the team's, first-ever point in Formula One.

In between years

Moreno went back to North America with Siddle. A sponsor had been found for a whole season of Formula Atlantic, but the support race at Long Beach GP was changed to a Super Vee, then he lost his sponsor. Despite the set-back, his new team, Theodore Racing went off and won the first race at Willow Springs. With the prize money, he did two more races, before the team stopped racing. Luckily for Moreno, the team owner, Teddy Yip help finance a move to another team.  He won four races, while championship rival, Michael Andretti won three. Moreno missed out on the title as every time he won, Andretti would finish second.

For 1984, Roberto decided to return to Europe to race F3. Whilst pre-season testing with West Surrey Racing, he got an invitation from Tauranac to join the works Ralt Formula Two team. Moreno finished runner-up to Mike Thackwell, the pair dominated the final European Formula Two Championship, in their Ralt-Hondas. He tasted victory at the Hockenheim and Donington Park races. Tauranac wanted Moreno to stay for the inaugural International Formula 3000 season (1985), but Moreno had been testing the Toleman at the end of 1984, with Senna's car. He look set to get a drive with the team, only to be told that they did not have any tyres, and the deal fell through. A move to Indycars was next for Roberto with Rick Galles's Galles Racing, as he had seen Moreno impress frequently. The deal was for Roberto to drive in the road race. He was invited to do a full campaign in 1986, however they had problems with the car and did not have any good results. When he was unable to find a full-time Indycar drive, he decided to try to get into F3000 driving with Ralt. During that season, he won Gran Premio del Mediterraneo, together with some consistent finishing saw him finished 3rd overall, before receiving the call to join up with AGS.

On the suggestion of his friend, Brabham lead driver and defending World Champion Nelson Piquet, Brabham team owner Bernie Ecclestone almost signed the young Brazilian to drive the team's #2 car. However, this opportunity for Moreno came to nothing when Brabham's Italian based sponsor Parmalat insisted on having an Italian driver as Piquet's teammate. This led to the unique situation where Ecclestone signed brothers Teo and Corrado Fabi to share the drive in the car.

His performance at AGS did not get him a seat in F1. He went to Bromley Motorsport in F3000. The team, owned by Ron Salt, had Gary Anderson as its Technical Director, with whom Roberto had worked with at Galles. With help from Reynard Motorsport, they began the season with virtually no money. Revenge was sweet, when Moreno took a sponsorless Reynard-Cosworth 88D to the title by winning three early-season races, at Pau, Silverstone and Monza in a row. A fourth win came in the Birmingham Superprix.

F1 substitute (1989–1995)

Not even winning the FIA International Formula 3000 Championship in 1988 in an unsponsored Reynard 88D made the impression needed for a big team to recruit him. Instead, he signed a testing contract with Ferrari, who helped him land a racing drive with the ambitious Coloni outfit. The car was never competitive and Moreno only made the grid four times out of 16 attempts.

Initially, 1990 seemed to be even less promising, with Moreno signing for the nosediving EuroBrun outfit, qualifying for just 2 out of the first 14 races of the season. However, shortly after being informed the team would not be competing in the last two rounds of the season, he was contacted by Benetton to drive their second car, with Alessandro Nannini having almost lost a hand in a helicopter crash following the Spanish Grand Prix. After qualifying 8th, he then shadowed his teammate, Piquet, coming home an excellent 2nd on his Benetton debut in the 1990 Japanese Grand Prix at Suzuka, although this result was helped by most other top cars dropping out, with Alain Prost and Ayrton Senna famously colliding at the first corner while their teammates Nigel Mansell (Ferrari) and Gerhard Berger (McLaren) would both retire. After then again qualifying 8th in the Australian Grand Prix in Adelaide before going on to finish 7th (Piquet again won), Moreno got a full contract with Benetton for 1991 season.

However, the Benetton B191, on Pirelli tyres, was not as competitive as anticipated, and Moreno's best results were 4th place at the Monaco Grand Prix and the Belgian Grand Prix. In the latter race, Moreno made the fastest lap, but this was overshadowed by F1 debutant Michael Schumacher (driving for the Jordan team); this would be Moreno's last race for Benetton before he was controversially paid off and dropped in favour of Schumacher. Schumacher had qualified 7th, and was up to 5th after the start when his clutch failed. The Benetton management, led by Tom Walkinshaw and team manager Flavio Briatore, were after a driver to rebuild the team around, convinced that neither the aging Piquet or Moreno were that driver. Walkinshaw engaged in some high-level dealing behind the scenes and managed to steal Schumacher from Jordan and Moreno was promptly fired. As it was, Moreno was offered the vacant Jordan drive for the 1991 Italian Grand Prix, where he qualified a very respectable 9th (ahead of teammate Andrea de Cesaris). Unfortunately he spun off on the second lap and retired. He would race the next race in Portugal, and then replaced Gianni Morbidelli in the Minardi, at the last race of the year in Adelaide, but Formula One seemed to have passed him by.

For the 1992 season, he found himself back with the minnows, signing for Andrea Moda. The outfit had risen from the ashes of Scuderia Coloni, and after two non-starting races with Alex Caffi and Enrico Bertaggia, decided to start over with Moreno and Perry McCarthy (who would later claim fame as the original Stig on the BBC motoring show Top Gear). Moreno and McCarthy faced an uphill struggle, with the uncompetitive team scrambling to even get to most races. Moreno would only qualify the under-tested, under-funded car once, for the Monaco Grand Prix, before the team collapsed following team owner Andrea Sassetti's arrest at the Belgian Grand Prix.

After the Andrea Moda disaster, he spent the next two seasons racing Italian and French Touring Cars, and also attempted to qualify for the 1994 Indianapolis 500. 1995 saw Moreno making a brief Formula One comeback, with the ambitious Forti team. Moreno's Brazilian heritage helped him land the drive. Sadly, their car was comparatively slow, and Moreno's best result was 14th in the Belgian Grand Prix. He would exit Formula One crashing into the pitlane wall at the Australian Grand Prix.

IndyCar

1996 would see Moreno resume his Champ Car career, as he raced a Payton-Coyne Racing Lola-Ford, finishing 3rd at Michigan. At the beginning of 1997, he quit Payton-Coyne for its lack of commitment. He drove for three teams during the 1997 season, earning the nickname "Supersub", with his best result of 5th at Detroit in a Newman-Haas Swift-Ford. Here, he replaced an injured Christian Fittipaldi. He outqualified the team leader, Michael Andretti on several occasions, but still could not pick up a competitive drive for 1998, instead accepting a testing role with Penske.

1998 was more barren, with just three drives. The following season again saw him take two different cars (Newman/Haas and PacWest), with two 4th places his best. In 1999 he also made his first Indy Racing League start at Phoenix International Raceway finishing 6th and returned to the Indianapolis 500 after a 13 year absence finishing 20th for Truscelli Team Racing. Only in 2000, having subbed for Patrick Racing in the previous season, Roberto was granted a full-time seat in one of their Reynard Motorsport-Fords, and he led the series for much of the distance, before hitting a low patch, and losing out to Gil de Ferran, eventually ranking 3rd overall.

Moreno won his first Champ Car race at Cleveland, and in a scene scarcely seen in motor racing, the emotional Moreno wept openly. It had been his first race victory since his Formula 3000 victory twelve years earlier. He won again for Patrick Racing at Vancouver the following year, but was less consistent and dropped to 13th in the standings.

In 2003 he drove for Herdez Competition, taking his Lola-Cosworth to 2nd at Miami, and announced his retirement from motorsport at the end of the year.

In April 2006, after just one outing in a Brazilian Stock Car at Jacarepaguá, Moreno substituted for Ed Carpenter at Vision Racing, in the Honda Grand Prix of St. Petersburg.

In August of the same year, Moreno became the first driver to test the new Panoz-built Champ Car. According to former series champion Paul Tracy, "[Moreno's] a guy who's not going to go out there and make mistakes and go off the road. They need to put miles on the car and run it fairly quickly, and he's the perfect guy for the job."

After running thousands of miles of testing in the Panoz DP01, Moreno got a chance to race it at the 2007 Grand Prix of Houston, substituting for the injured Alex Figge at Pacific Coast Motorsports.

Roberto drove as a replacement for an injured Stéphan Grégoire at the 2007 Indianapolis 500 for Chastain Motorsports. He crashed the car early in the race and finished in last place.

Helmet
Moreno's helmet has traditionally been yellow, with blue, red, and white wings adorning the visor, sides, and chin area.  Written on the lower portion of the helmet is the name "Moreno."  Later versions of his helmet have included blue cylindrical designs along with the wings.  His helmets are designed by Sid Mosca.

Racing record

Career summary

Complete 24 Hours of Le Mans results

Complete 24 Hours of Daytona results

Complete 24 Hours of Spa results

Complete European Formula Two Championship results
(key) (Races in bold indicate pole position; races in italics indicate fastest lap.)

Complete International Formula 3000 results
(key) (Races in bold indicate pole position; races in italics indicate fastest lap.)

Complete Formula One results
(key) (races in italics indicate fastest lap)

Complete American Open-Wheel racing results
(key)

CART/Champ Car World Series

IRL IndyCar Series

 1 Run on same day.
 2 Non-points race.

Indianapolis 500

References

External links

1959 births
Living people
Brazilian racing drivers
Brazilian people of Spanish descent
Brazilian Formula One drivers
Andrea Moda Formula One drivers
AGS Formula One drivers
Benetton Formula One drivers
Coloni Formula One drivers
EuroBrun Formula One drivers
IndyCar Series drivers
Indianapolis 500 drivers
Brazilian Champ Car drivers
Atlantic Championship drivers
Brazilian IndyCar Series drivers
European Formula Two Championship drivers
International Formula 3000 Champions
FIA European Formula 3 Championship drivers
Jordan Formula One drivers
Team Lotus Formula One drivers
Minardi Formula One drivers
Forti Formula One drivers
Grand Prix Masters drivers
International Formula 3000 drivers
Formula Ford drivers
24 Hours of Le Mans drivers
24 Hours of Daytona drivers
Stock Car Brasil drivers
Eurocup Mégane Trophy drivers
World Sportscar Championship drivers
24 Hours of Spa drivers
Sportspeople from Rio de Janeiro (city)
PacWest Racing drivers
Schnitzer Motorsport drivers
Bettenhausen Racing drivers
Newman/Haas Racing drivers
Dale Coyne Racing drivers
Vision Racing drivers
HVM Racing drivers
Graff Racing drivers